was a village located in Shimominochi District, Nagano Prefecture, Japan.

As of 2003, the village had an estimated population of 5,116 and a density of 147.27 persons per km². The total area was 34.74 km².

On April 1, 2005, Toyota was merged into the expanded city of Nakano.

Dissolved municipalities of Nagano Prefecture
Nakano, Nagano